In 1946 the Football League in the United Kingdom fully resumed on a national basis following the disruption caused by World War II. In the club's first post-war First Division match, on 31 August 1946; Arsenal lost 6–1 to Wolves, their biggest League defeat in nearly twenty years. Although the Gunners had been the dominant force in English football in the 1930s, they struggled in their first season after the war, only finishing 13th.

Players
Players returning after the break included Cliff Bastin, Bryn Jones, Reg Lewis, Jimmy Logie, George Male, David Nelson and Laurie Scott. George Swindin established himself as Arsenal's undisputed No. 1, a position he would hold for the next six seasons. The squad included brothers Leslie Compton and Denis Compton both of whom also played Cricket for Middlesex. Ian McPherson made his Arsenal debut in the opening match against Wolves. He played 40 times that season on the right wing.

Dr. Kevin O'Flanagan made 14 First Division appearances and scored three goals. He made his first-class league debut against Blackburn Rovers on 4 September and his last appearance for the senior team came on 28 December 1946 against Wolves. Bernard Joy played the first half of the 1946–47 season before deciding that his age (35) was counting against him; he retired from top-flight football in December 1946. George Curtis played 12 times in the 1946–47 season, but was sold to Southampton in part-exchange for Don Roper in summer 1947.

Joe Mercer made his Arsenal debut against Bolton Wanderers on 30 November 1946 and soon after became club captain. Everton boss Theo Kelly had brought Mercer's boots to the transfer negotiations to prevent Mercer having a reason to go back to say goodbye to the other players at Everton. His transfer fee was set at £9,000 (2015: £).

Arsenal were unsuccessful in their attempts to land Archie Macaulay, who signed with Brentford F.C. in October 1946.

Despite being nearly 35 and having never played in the top flight, Ronnie Rooke was signed by Arsenal (Cyril Grant going in the other direction). The move was surprising, but Rooke immediately made an impact, scoring the winner on his debut against Charlton Athletic on 14 December. He scored 21 goals in just 24 League matches that season.

Matches
On 21 September 63,000 attended Highbury to see Arsenal beaten by Derby County. Czech Champions, AC Sparta opened their tour of Britain with a 2–2 draw against Arsenal on 2 October with Albert Guðmundsson, later Iceland's Minister of Finance, playing inside forward for The Gunners.

Despite leading at half time, Arsenal lost to Sheffield United in early November. Six changes were made for the match against Preston North End the following week: Walley Barnes replaced Joy at left back. With Jones still injured, Lewis was moved to inside forward and Cyril Grant made his Arsenal debut as centre forward. However, the poor form continued and Arsenal lost 2–0.

Each November between 1930 and 1962, Racing Club de Paris hosted a prestige game with Arsenal. In 1946 The London club were beaten 2–1 at Colombes Stadium. In mid November they beat Oxford University 6–0 with goals by Doug Farquhar, Morgan (2) and Whalley (3).

Results
Arsenal's score comes first

https://www.11v11.com/teams/arsenal/tab/matches/season/1947/

Legend

Football League First Division

Final League table

Results by round

FA Cup

Player statistics
Players with name struck through and marked  left the club during the playing season.

References

External links
 Arsenal season-by-season line-ups

1946-47
English football clubs 1946–47 season